Skytanthus is a genus of plant in family Apocynaceae first described as a genus in 1834. It is native to Brazil and Chile in South America.

Species
 Skytanthus acutus Meyen - from Antofagasta to Coquimbo in N + C Chile
 Skytanthus hancorniifolius (A.DC.) Miers - E Brazil
 Skytanthus martianus (Müll.Arg.) Miers - Bahia + Minas Gerais in Brazil

Formerly placed in this genus
 Skytanthus havanensis (Müll.Arg.) Miers = Cameraria latifolia L.

References

 
Apocynaceae genera